The Voordelta is the coastal area in the North Sea, protected under Natura 2000. It is located to the west of the islands of the provinces of South Holland and Zeeland, around the deltas of Haringvliet, Grevelingen, and Oosterschelde. The total area of Voordelta is about 900 km2.
Coasts

References

 Voordelta

North Sea
Holland
Geography of the Netherlands
Regions of the Netherlands
Ramsar sites in the Netherlands